Siay, officially the Municipality of Siay (Chavacano: Municipalidad de Siay), is a 2nd class municipality in the province of Zamboanga Sibugay, Philippines. According to the 2020 census, it has a population of 40,585 people.

The municipality is located in the 2nd District and the eastern part of the province of Zamboanga Sibugay. It is 38 kilometers from Ipil, 220 kilometers to Dipolog, and 180 kilometers east to Zamboanga City. It is geographically situated within a map coordination of 741 east & 122* 53*west.

Siay is bounded from the north by the municipality of Diplahan, south by the Sibuguey Bay, west by the municipality of Kabasalan, and east by the municipality of Imelda.

Geography

Barangays
Siay is politically subdivided into 29 barangays.

Climate

Demographics

Economy

References

External links

 Siay Profile at PhilAtlas.com
 [ Philippine Standard Geographic Code]
Philippine Census Information

Municipalities of Zamboanga Sibugay